The 2016 season is Army United's 14th season in the Thai Premier League on 1996–1999, 2006–2008 and since 2010.

Squad

Foreign Players

Thai League

Thai FA Cup
Chang FA Cup

Thai League Cup
Toyota League Cup

Squad goals statistics

Transfers
First Thai footballer's market is opening on December 27, 2015 to January 28, 2016
Second Thai footballer's market is opening on June 3, 2016 to June 30, 2016

In

Out

Loan in

Loan Out

Notes

Army United F.C. seasons
Army United